Mulab may refer to:
 Mulab-e Olya

See also 

 MuLab, a digital audio workstation